Attache ta tuque ! is a 2003 double live album by Québécois néo-trad band Les Cowboys Fringants. This album also included a bonus video DVD with music videos and some shots from the live show.

Track listing

Disc one
Heavy Metal
Québécois de souche	
Le pouceux
Mon chum Rémi
Salut mon Ron!
Le temps perdu
Le gars d'la compagnie
Léopold
Le shack à Hector
Le plombier
Toune d'automne
Mon pays
Le reel des aristocrates
La tête à Papineau
Ruelle Laurier

Disc two
La manifestation
Maurice au bistro
Banlieue
La sainte paix
Robert Bob Bourgouin
Su' mon Big Wheel (C'tait l'fun)
Awikatchikaën
Le roi Katshé (1re partie)
Joyeux calvaire
Le roi Katshé (2e partie)
Impala Blues
En berne
L'hiver approche
Le toune cachée
Un p'tit tour

Les Cowboys Fringants albums
2003 live albums
2003 video albums
Music video compilation albums
2003 compilation albums
Live video albums